Below is a list of attempts to escape from Oflag IV-C, the famous prisoner-of-war camp.

1941 escape attempts

1942 escape attempts

1943 escape attempts

1944 escape attempts

1945 escape attempts

Further reading

External links
Escape from Colditz Castle — Article about escape attempts from Colditz Castle

Colditz Castle
World War II prisoner of war camps in Germany
Oflag IV-C